The sixth-generation iPad Pro, colloquially known as the M2 iPad Pro, is a line of iPad tablet computers developed and marketed by Apple Inc. It was announced on October 18, 2022 and was released on October 26, 2022. It is available with the same screen size options as its predecessor: 11-inch (28 cm) and 12.9-inch (33 cm).

Upgrades over the previous generation include the Apple M2 processor, the Apple Pencil hover which shows where the Apple Pencil will touch down on the display, support for Wi-Fi 6E, Bluetooth 5.3, and Smart HDR 4.

Features

Hardware 
The sixth-generation iPad Pro uses an Apple M2 SoC. It features an eight-core CPU with four performance cores and four efficiency cores, an 10-core GPU, and a 16-core Neural Engine. Internal storage options include 128 GB, 256 GB, 512 GB, 1 TB and 2 TB. The 128, 256, and 512 GB versions include 8 GB of RAM, while the 1 and 2 TB versions include 16 GB of RAM.

The 11-inch model has a Liquid Retina display with a peak brightness at 600 nits, which is the same as the 11-inch model of the 3rd, 4th, and 5th generations. The 12.9-inch model, in contrasts, boasts mini LED HDR display called the Liquid Retina XDR display built in with a 1,000,000:1 contrast ratio, full screen brightness of 1000 nits and a peak brightness of 1600 nits (HDR), which is the same as the 12.9-inch model of the 5th generation. Both models support True Tone, ProMotion, 120 Hz variable refresh rate, and P3 wide color gamut.

The iPad Pro uses 100% recycled aluminum and sources at least 99% recycled rare earth element supplies. It is free of any harmful substances, as defined by Apple's proprietary "Apple Regulated Substances Specification".

Accessories 
The sixth-generation iPad Pro supports the second-generation Apple Pencil, the Magic Keyboard, the Magic Trackpad, the Magic Mouse, Smart Keyboard Folio, and USB-C accessories.

Reception 
The sixth-generation iPad Pro received mixed responses from critics. Some reviewers said that the front-facing camera is not in a landscape position, compared to the 10th-generation iPad, while others criticized the outdated Magic Keyboard, lacking the function keys used on the 10th-generation iPad. Some reviewers praised the Apple Pencil hover, fast performance, battery life, and the display.

References

External links 

Official Tech specs website

Pro
Tablet computers
Touchscreen portable media players
Tablet computers introduced in 2022
Foxconn